Billy Farwig (born 24 October 1957) is a Bolivian alpine skier. He competed in three events at the 1980 Winter Olympics.

References

1957 births
Living people
Bolivian male alpine skiers
Olympic alpine skiers of Bolivia
Alpine skiers at the 1980 Winter Olympics
Sportspeople from La Paz